Robert Eben Smylie (October 31, 1914 – July 17, 2004) was an American politician and attorney from Idaho.  A member of the Idaho Republican Party, he served as the 24th governor of Idaho for twelve years, from 1955 to 1967. He was the first Governor of Idaho who was born in the 20th century.

Early life and education
Born in Marcus, Iowa, Smylie graduated from high school in Cresco in 1932 at the height of the Great Depression. Offered a place to live by an uncle, in 1934, he moved to Idaho to attend the College of Idaho in Caldwell. During the school year, he participated in speech and debate, the yearbook, football, and student government, and received a scholarship from the National Youth Administration for working as a secretary for the Department of Philosophy and Religion. At The College of Idaho, Smylie studied Political Science and developed his initial interests in current events—attending a political rally for John Hamilton, Franklin D. Roosevelt's republican opponent for the US Presidency in 1936, attending Roosevelt's visit to The College of Idaho in 1937, and competing in debate and oratory events at the Pi Kappa Delta National Tournament at Washburn University in Topeka, KS in 1938, the year of his graduation. During his college years, Smylie concluded that hitchhiking was "a thoroughly respectable manner of travel," and would hitchhike back to Iowa in the summers.

Career 
After graduating from law school in 1938, he moved to Washington D.C., where he simultaneously clerked at the law firm of Covington Burling, was a United States Capitol Police officer, and attended George Washington University Law School until his graduation in 1942.

Having begun practicing law in Washington, D.C., Smylie left his practice in 1942 to join the United States Coast Guard as a lawyer and was stationed in Philadelphia and the Philippines during World War II.  He returned to his private practice in 1946.

Attorney general of Idaho 
In January 1947, Smylie became a deputy attorney general in Idaho, under newly-elected Robert Ailshie. That November, Ailshie unexpectedly died of a heart attack at age 39; Smylie was appointed attorney general at age 33 by Governor C. A. Robins, and was elected to a full four-year term in 1950.

Governor of Idaho 
Smylie ran for governor in 1954, as the seat was not eligible for re-election at the time and was held by Republican Len Jordan. Starting with the 1946 election, Idaho changed from two-year to four-year terms for governor, but with the change it disallowed self-succession (re-election). Smylie was elected governor at age forty in 1954 and successfully lobbied the 1955 legislature to propose an amendment to the state constitution to allow gubernatorial re-election, which was approved by voters in the 1956 general election. Smylie, the first Idaho governor born in the 20th century, was re-elected in 1958 and 1962.

During his tenure, a state park system was created, and a sales tax adopted. In February 1955, following a prompt from a BBC reporter, Smylie fast-tracked legislation to remove the anomaly of Idaho being the only one of the 48 states that did not observe George Washington's Birthday as a holiday.  While governor, Smylie served as chair of the Western Governors Association (1959–1961) and as chair of the Republican Governors Association. He was a delegate to the Republican National Convention in 1960. Smylie served on the National Governor's Conference Executive Committee from 1956 to 1957, from 1959 to 1960, and in 1963.

Smylie ran for a fourth term in 1966, but was soundly defeated (61–39%) in the Republican primary by his successor, Don Samuelson, whom he had encouraged to run for the state senate six years earlier. Smylie attributed his support of the newly implemented sales tax of three per cent in 1965 as a major factor in his defeat. The sales tax was easily approved by voters in the November election; it stayed at three per cent until  and is now

Later career 
Leaving the governor's office after a dozen years at age 52, Smylie returned to the practice of law in 1967. He served as trustee, chair of trustees, and as acting president of the College of Idaho.

1972 U.S. Senate election 
Smylie was a candidate for the 1972 United States Senate election in Idaho, but finished fourth in the Republican primary, won by Jim McClure.

Personal life
Smylie married Lucile Irwin on December 4, 1943 and the couple had two sons.

Smylie died in Boise at age 89 on July 17, 2004, and his wife Lucile died less than six weeks later. They are interred at Pioneer Cemetery in Boise. Lucile's sister Virgil was the widow of D. Worth Clark, Democratic U.S. Senator from Idaho.

References

External links 
 Papers of Robert E. Smylie, Dwight D. Eisenhower Presidential Library
 
Basque Museum – obituary from the Idaho Statesman
National Governors Association

|-

|-

|-

1914 births
2004 deaths
20th-century American lawyers
20th-century American politicians
Methodists from Iowa
College of Idaho alumni
George Washington University Law School alumni
Republican Party governors of Idaho
Idaho Attorneys General
Idaho lawyers
People from Cherokee County, Iowa
People from Cresco, Iowa
People from Boise, Idaho
Military personnel from Iowa
United States Capitol Police officers
Lawyers from Washington, D.C.
Methodists from Idaho